The 2000 African Cup Winners' Cup was the twenty-sixth season of Africa's second oldest club football tournament organised by CAF.

In a final featuring two giants of African club football, four time African champions Zamalek of Egypt defeated three time African champions Canon Yaoundé of Cameroon 4–3 on aggregate over two-legs.

Association team allocation 
A total of 38 teams from 38 CAF associations qualified for the tournament after winning their respective premier domestic cups. Of the 38 teams that qualified 1 withdrew before fulfilling all of its fixtures and another was disqualified;
 Central African club Réal Olympique failed to show up for its Preliminary Round second leg match against Rayon Sports.
 Algerian club U.S.M. Alger was disqualified for fielding an ineligible player during their second leg tie against JS du Ténéré in the First Round.

Format 
The tournament consisted of five rounds preceding a two-legged final.
 Preliminary round – The 12 lowest ranked teams – whose rankings were determined by their association's performances at previous CAF club tournaments – were drawn against each other in 6 matches consisting of two-legs each.
 First round – The 6 winners from the preliminary round were then drawn against the remaining 26 clubs, resulting in 16 matches consisting of two-legs each.
 Second round – The 16 winners from the first round were then drawn against each other, resulting in 8 matches consisting of two-legs each.
 Quarter-finals – The 8 winners from the second round were then drawn against each other, resulting in 4 matches consisting of two-legs each.
 Semi-finals – The 4 victorious quarter-finalists were then drawn against each other in 2 semi-finals consisting of two-legs each.
 Final – The victorious semi-finalists contested a two-legged final to determine the champion.

The away goals rule was used to determine the victors in the event of a match being tied over the two-legs. If it was not possible to determine a winner using the away goals rule, the tie went to a penalty shootout to determine the winner.

Preliminary round
The first legs were played on 29 & 30 January, and the second legs were played on 12 & 14 February 2000.

Matches 

|}
Notes:
 Following a 1–1 draw at home to Rayon Sports in the first leg, Central African club Réal Olympique failed to show up for the second leg, handing Rayon Sports a walkover into the First Round.

First round
The first legs were played from 17–19 March, and the second legs were played from 31 March-2 April 2000 with the exception of the matches between ASEC Ndiambour and ASEC Mimosas which were played on the 2nd (first leg) and 16th (second leg) of April.

Matches 

|}
Notes:
 U.S.M. Alger were disqualified after fielding an ineligible player in the second leg tie against JS du Ténéré. U.S.M. Algers''' disqualification allowed JS du Ténéré, who had originally lost the tie 2–1 on aggregate, to progress to the Second Round.
 The second leg tie between Telecom Wanderers and Coffee FC in Blantyre was abandoned after 84 minutes. At the time of abandonment Telecom Wanderers were leading 2–1 but losing 4–2 on aggregate to Coffee FC, resulting in Telecom Wanderers' elimination at the hands of Coffee FC.

Second round
The first legs were played on 6 & 7 May (with the exception of the tie between JS du Ténéré & Stade Malien which was played on 14 May), and the second legs were played on 27 & 28 May 2000.

 Matches 

|}

 Quarter-finals 
The first legs were played on 5 & 6 August, and the second legs were played on 19 & 20 August 2000.

 Matches 

|}

 Semi-finals 
The first legs were played on 14 & 15 October, and the second legs were played on 27 & 30 October 2000.

 Matches 

|}

Final

|}

First leg

Second legZamalek'' won the two-legged final 4–3 on aggregate

External links
 Results available on CAF Official Website
 Results available on RSSSF

African Cup Winners' Cup
2